Jerry Haas (born September 16, 1963) is an American professional golfer who coaches Wake Forest University's golf team and used to play on the PGA Tour, Nationwide Tour and the European Tour.

Amateur career
Haas was born in Belleville, Illinois. He won the Illinois Amateur championship in 1982 and 1984 while he attended Wake Forest. In 1985 he was named second team All-American in his final year at Wake and was also selected to the American 1985 Walker Cup team. Haas finished an impressive T-31 at the 1985 Masters Tournament as an amateur. He turned professional in 1986.

Professional career
Haas played on the European Tour in 1988 and 1989. He finished 57th on the money list in 1989. Haas finished in 3rd at qualifying school in 1989 earning him his PGA Tour card for 1990. He played on the PGA Tour full-time in 1990 and 1991 and split time between the Nationwide Tour and the PGA Tour in 1992. He played on the Nationwide Tour in 1993 and 1994 and won three events on tour in 1994. Those three wins helped earn Haas his PGA Tour card for 1995 but he would have to go back to the Nationwide Tour in 1996.

In 1997, Haas stopped playing professionally and spent a year as a commentator for The Golf Channel and also spent time as a teaching professional at the Yorktown Golf Club in his hometown of Belleville, Illinois.

Coaching career
Haas was named the head coach of the Wake Forest Demon Deacons golf team on September 1, 1997 and with the hiring stopped playing professional golf. He rebuilt the Wake Forest golf program and during his time they have seen over 15 All-ACC selections and over 15 individual tournament champions.

Personal life
Haas comes from a distinguished family of golfers. He is a nephew of 1968 Masters winner Bob Goalby, and has several other relations in golf including his brother Jay, nephews Bill and Jay Jr., and brother-in-law Dillard Pruitt. Jerry coached Bill at Wake Forest.

Amateur wins (2)
1982 Illinois Amateur
1984 Illinois Amateur

Professional wins (8)

Nike Tour wins (3)

Other wins (5)
1997 Southern Illinois Open
2012 South Carolina Open
2014 Carolinas PGA Championship
2015 Carolinas Open
2018 Carolinas Open

Results in major championships

Note: Haas never played in The Open Championship.
LA = Low amateur

CUT = missed the half-way cut
"T" = tied

U.S. national team appearances
Amateur
Walker Cup: 1985 (winners)

See also
1989 PGA Tour Qualifying School graduates
1990 PGA Tour Qualifying School graduates
1994 Nike Tour graduates

References

External links

Profile on Wake Forest's official site

American male golfers
Wake Forest Demon Deacons men's golfers
PGA Tour golfers
PGA Tour Champions golfers
Korn Ferry Tour graduates
Golfers from Illinois
Golfers from North Carolina
Sportspeople from Belleville, Illinois
Sportspeople from Winston-Salem, North Carolina
1963 births
Living people